The Korean Basketball League rookie draft (Korean: 한국프로농구 신인드래프트) is an annual event that allows teams to take turns selecting amateur basketball players and other eligible players. Eligible players attend a series of try-outs organized by the KBL roughly analogous to the NFL Scouting Combine and NBA Draft Combine, where they have their height, arm span and other measurements taken. Their predicted draft rankings are not based solely on their performances during the try-outs as players are evaluated much earlier from their performances during the U-League season, at high school tournaments or in the senior national team.

Eligibility
Only South Korean citizens (FIBA-registered nationality) are eligible to be drafted. Foreign players are drafted separately due to an existing foreign player quota while foreign players who have a Korean parent but hold a foreign nationality may be drafted through the ethnic draft and not be counted as a foreign player.

The applicant must first be registered with the Korean Basketball Association as an amateur in order to be eligible for the draft. Regardless of background, all applicants must apply through a "general public draft" (Korean: 일반인 드래프트). Generally, there are two categories of applicants:
 1) Players enrolled in and playing for a university registered as a Division 1 member of the Korean Universities Basketball Federation (KUBF) 
 2) Other categories of amateur players, which include:
 High school students in their final year of high school (Korean: 고3; high school senior) who wish to enter the professional league without playing college basketball 
 South Korean nationals who played for a high school or university team outside South Korea
 Undrafted players from the previous year
 University students playing for a KUBF Division 2 institution
 Players from a KUBF Division 1-member institution but had taken a leave of absence from the team and wish to return

All players go through a try-out and have their height, weight and arm span measurements taken. Players from the first category are then automatically added to the KBL's rookie list while players from the second category must pass another try-out which includes playing in a series of 3x3 and 5x5 games, with KBL scouts and coaches in attendance. Their names are then added to the rookie list if nominated.

Venue
From its inception until 2012, the draft took place in a hotel convention room or exhibition hall. Since 2013, it has taken place at the Jamsil Students' Gymnasium in Seoul. Prior to COVID-19, family members and selected guests, mainly the candidates' college teammates or coaches, were allowed to attend.

List of first overall picks

First overall picks by university

History
The KBL rookie draft initially took place in January or February as it was the end of the academic year and all draft prospects were college seniors. An issue which arose from the timing of the draft was the fact that rookies only joined their teams towards the end of the KBL season, which runs from October to March the following year. They had little time gel with their new teammates or acclimatize to the professional game. 

Beginning with 2012, the draft was scheduled in October or November, at the conclusion of the U-League season. Players from college teams will finish the season and declare eligibility for the upcoming draft before participating in the try-outs. They would generally join their new teams during the second round of the season. The timing of the draft day posed a "sink or swim" scenario for rookies as they had little time to familiarize themselves with their new teammates and coaches: rookies who are able to adapt to the professional league quickly enough are integrated into the main team by the end of the season while those unable to do so spend most of the season in the D-League (reserves).

The 2021 draft was moved back a month to September due to the abbreviated U-League season. The move was met with positive responses from players and teams as it allowed rookies to join pre-season training with their new teams.

Since the 2014 draft, there has been an increase in high school seniors and college freshmen, sophomores and juniors being picked earlier. Cha Min-seok was the first high school senior to be picked first overall. Yonsei University sophomore Lee Won-seok, first overall pick of the 2021 draft, was the first to have not been a college senior.

Notable drafts
Korean-language basketball magazine Rookie and newspaper Sports Dong-a have both retrospectively dubbed the 2007 draft as the "Golden Draft". Compared to past and present draft classes, as of the 2020–21 season, more players from this draft have won the KBL Championship and continued to play regularly in their respective teams into their mid-thirties. The draft produced two KBL Most Valuable Player Award winners, statistical leaders and several "one club men" who spent entire decade-long careers with their original teams. 

Other notable draft years include 2008, 2011 and 2014. Although not on the level of the 2007, the aforementioned drafts are viewed as "high-level" due to the larger numbers of first round draftees who have gone on to establish themselves as first-option players for their respective teams, won individual awards and called-up to the national team for international tournaments. 

The 2017 draft was initially derided as a "worst ever" draft as only several players stood out from their performances in the U-League. It has since been retrospectively re-evaluated as a "high-level" draft as half of the first round picks have gone on to establish themselves in their teams and been selected for the national team.

See also
Draft (sports)

Notes

References

External Links
Draft / 드래프트 — Korean Basketball League official website 

 
Recurring sporting events established in 1998
1998 establishments in South Korea